is a Japanese actress, cinematographer, director and writer. Her first role was in the American film The Neptune Factor, but she is perhaps best known for starring in the Japanese cyberpunk cult film Tetsuo: The Iron Man. More recently she has devoted her time to writing and directing, and is known for her surreal and violent experimental films as well as her experimental theater company Organ Vital.

Biography 
Fujiwara was born into a poor family in a rural part of Kumamoto in 1957, and moved to Tokyo in her early twenties to pursue a career in theater. Playwright Jūrō Kara wrote roles for her to act in his plays and eventually became her mentor. She spent years creating underground theater companies, and collaborated with Shinya Tsukamoto in the 1980s on the plays and 8 mm films he created. Becoming closely involved with Tsukamoto's underground theater troupe Kaijyu Theater, she took on the title of his "right hand" woman and played a contributing role in his films The Phantom of Regular Size (1986), The Adventure of Denchu Kozo (1987), and Tetsuo: The Iron Man (1989). For Tsukamoto's film Tetsuo: The Iron Man, she participated both in front of the camera as the unnamed Girlfriend character, as well as behind the camera as the prop artist and one of the cinematographers. In addition, Fujiwara's apartment was used as a primary set for the film, with even her cats appearing in certain scenes. She also engineered Tetsuo's iconic phallic drill.

After the production of Tetsuo, she returned to underground theater and working with Jūrō Kara. She also formed the Organ Vital company, which produced the play Organ and adapted the play into the film of the same name. When interviewed, Fujiwara has said that the name "Organ Vital" comes from an Antonin Artaud book "...that featured this French term. It meant the vessels of life. When translated to English, I'm told it just becomes, 'vitals of organ,' or something, but in Japanese it is called gozōroppu and to me signifies the corporal. That's the name of my theater company, and it has always been that for me. Born into this three-dimensional world with bodies, we sense and express." Fujiwara returned again as a film actress in Organ, playing the role of Yoko, the eye-patch wearing sister of organ dealer and high school biology teacher Jun.

Organ and her later 2005 film Ido never gained financial or critical success, but have become noted examples of the Japanese horror genre. She has continued producing theatre work through Organ Vital: a new "nomadic" theatre project called Ibunkitan debuted in 2019, and has been presented in shops, salons, and temples.

She lives in a remote part of the Nagano mountains  and operates a cat shelter in her spare time.

Style and themes 
Fujiwara's work deals with themes of morality, spirituality, fear, pain (bodily transformation and decay), and pleasure. Her films are known for their graphic depiction of gore and violence and their surreal, experimental style.

She states, "I think humans, in order to live, can't cut those away from existence. If you deny desire, you're not human. The existence of such things causes our misery, too. Thus, desire and slaughter are inescapable. My fear and sorrow regarding this, and my questioning what are they anyway. That's what I wanted to portray."

She cites the work of Buddhist novelist Kenji Miyazawa and manga artists Osamu Tezuka, Sanpei Shirato, and Daijiro Morohoshi as being influential to her creative worldview.

Filmography 
As actress
The Neptune Factor (1973)
Denchu Kozo No Boken (The Adventure of Denchu Kozo) (1987)
Tetsuo: The Iron Man (1989)
Organ (1996)
Ido (2005)

As director
Organ (1996)
Ido (2005)

As cinematographer

 Tetsuo: The Iron Man (1989)
 Organ (1996)
 Ido (2005)

As writer

Organ (1996)
Ido (2005)

As costume designer

Denchu Kozo No Boken (The Adventure of Denchu Kozo) (1987)
Tetsuo: The Iron Man (1989)

References

External links 

Japanese actresses
Living people
1957 births
Japanese women film directors
Place of birth missing (living people)
Japanese women cinematographers
Horror film directors